The American Scene is a musical composition consisting of five orchestral suites composed in 1957 by American composer William Grant Still.

Overview
The composition is described as follows:

Movements
The collection of suites is as follows:

Suite No. 1 - The East

Suite No. 2 - The Southwest

Suite No. 3 - The Old West

I. Song of the Plainsmen

II. Sioux Love Song (Based on a Sioux Melody)

III. Tribal Dance

Suite No. 4 - The Far West

Suite No. 5 - A Mountain, a Memorial and a Song 

I. Grand Teton (A symbol of America's strength) 

II. Tomb of the Unknown Soldier ("Our Boys" will never be forgotten) 

III. Song of the Rivermen (They sing of the Mississippi)

See also
 List of jazz-influenced classical compositions

References

Further reading

External links
 

Compositions by William Grant Still
1957 compositions